McCready and Daughter was a short-lived British television crime drama, broadcast on BBC One, from 15 June 2000 until 20 July 2001. Just six episodes of the series were produced. The series starred Lorcan Cranitch and Patsy Palmer as Michael and Clare McCready, a father and daughter who are reunited through their work as private investigators within an Irish community in Kilburn, London, after Clare drops out of university and fails to find another job.

The part of Michael McCready was originally written for Tony Doyle, however Doyle died just days before filming was due to start. An initial pilot film was broadcast in 2000, before a series of five episodes followed in 2001. The series was originally written as a "star vehicle" for both Doyle and Palmer, paving the way for her return to television following her departure from EastEnders. The show's demise was blamed on poor viewing figures, and a lack of chemistry between the two main stars. The series has subsequently never been released on DVD.

Cast
 Lorcan Cranitch as Michael McCready
 Patsy Palmer as Clare McCready
 Brendan Coyle as Donal McCready
 David Westhead as DCI Alan Kendall
 Kim Thomson as Laura Cooper

Episodes

Pilot (2000)

Series (2001)

References

External links
 
.

2000s British drama television series
2000 British television series debuts
2001 British television series endings
2000s British crime television series
BBC television dramas
English-language television shows
2000s British mystery television series